Abraham Van Vechten (December 5, 1762 – January 6, 1837) was an American lawyer and a Federalist politician who served twice as New York State Attorney General.

Early life
Abraham Van Vechten was born on December 5, 1762, in Catskill, Albany County (now Greene County), New York.  He was the son of Dutch Americans Teunis Van Vechten (1707–1785) and Judikje "Judith" Ten Broeck (1721–1783).

His brothers were Samuel Ten Broeck Van Vechten (1742–1813) and Teunis Van Vechten (1749–1817), who became a prominent merchant in Albany and held the office of commissary on the staff of Governor Morgan Lewis during the revolution.  Their maternal grandfather was Jacob Ten Broeck (1688–1746), nephew of Dirck Wesselse Ten Broeck (1638–1717). Van Vechten was educated at Columbia College, studied law with John Lansing, Jr., and began practice in Johnstown, New York, but soon removed to Albany.

Career
In 1792, he was elected one of the first directors of the Bank of Albany.  From 1796 to 1797, he was Assistant Attorney General for the Fifth District, comprising Albany, Saratoga, Schoharie and Montgomery Counties. He was a Federalist presidential elector in 1796, and cast his votes for John Adams and Thomas Pinckney.

Van Vechten was the first lawyers admitted to the bar after the adoption of the New York State Constitution and ranked among the most gifted men of that time, including Alexander Hamilton, Aaron Burr and Robert Livingston.

Public office
From 1797 to 1808, Van Vechten served as Recorder of the City of Albany. Concurrently, he was a member of the New York State Senate, serving in the 22nd, 23rd, 24th, 25th, 26th, 27th and 28th New York State Legislatures from 1798 to 1805, representing the Eastern District, which included Washington, Clinton, Rensselaer, Albany and Saratoga counties.

After leaving the Senate, he was elected to the New York State Assembly, serving in the 29th, 30th, 31st, 32nd, 33rd, 34th, 35th and 36th New York State Legislatures from 1808 to 1813, representing Albany County.  While serving in the Assembly, he also served as the 10th New York State Attorney General from 1810 to 1811, and again from 1813 to 1815 as the 13th Attorney General, under Governor Daniel D. Tompkins. His successor was Martin Van Buren, who later became the 8th President of the United States.

After serving as Attorney General of New York, he was elected to return to the State Senate, serving in the 39th, 40th, 41st and 42nd New York State Legislatures from 1816 to 1819, representing the Middle District, which included Albany, Chenango, Columbia, Delaware, Greene, Orange, Otsego, Schoharie, Sullivan and Ulster counties.

In 1821, he was a delegate to the New York State Constitutional Convention, where he opposed the extension of the franchise.  From 1797 to 1823, he was a regent of the University of the State of New York.

In the 1828 presidential election, Van Vechten was a presidential elector, voting for the 6th President, John Quincy Adams and Richard Rush.

Personal life

In 1784, he married Catharina Schuyler (1766–1820), eldest daughter of Philip P. Schuyler (1736–1808) of the prominent Schuyler family. She grew up on her father's farm in the Schuyler Flatts section of the Manor of Rensselaerswyck. Catharina was the great-granddaughter of Pieter Schuyler (1657–1724), the first mayor of Albany, and Maria Van Rensselaer, daughter of Jeremias Van Rensselaer (1632–1674).  Together, they had thirteen children, including:
Judith Van Vechten (1785–1799)
Phillip Van Vechten (1786–1814)
Teunis A Van Vechten (1787–1811)
Anna Van Vechten (1789–1857)
Elizabeth Van Vechten (1791–1878)
Samuel Van Vechten (1794–1824)
Gertrude Van Vechten (1798–1842)
Jacob Ten Broeck Van Vechten (1801–1841)
Judith Van Vechten (1803–1825)

Van Vechten died in Albany on January 6, 1837, and was buried at Albany Rural Cemetery.

Sources

Further reading
 Finding Aid to Abraham Van Vechten Papers, 1686-1867 at the New York State Library, accessed May 18, 2016.
Bio at NY State Museum
Bio at Schenectady History
The New York Civil List compiled by Franklin Benjamin Hough (Weed, Parsons and Co., 1858) at Google Books
List of NY State Attorneys General, at Office of the Att. Gal. of NY

1762 births
1823 deaths
New York State Attorneys General
Members of the New York State Assembly
New York (state) state senators
American people of Dutch descent
Burials at Albany Rural Cemetery
Columbia College (New York) alumni
County district attorneys in New York (state)
New York (state) Federalists
Regents of the University of the State of New York
1796 United States presidential electors
New York (state) National Republicans
19th-century American politicians
People from Catskill, New York